Dylan Castanheira (born May 23, 1995) is an American soccer player who plays as a goalkeeper.

Career

Youth and college
Raised in the Landing section of Roxbury, New Jersey, Castanheira played prep soccer at Roxbury High School, leaving after his junior year to join the academy team of Bristol City in 2012, before returning to the United States in 2014.

Castanheira played four years of college soccer at Columbia University, where he made 47 appearances for the Lions and kept 25 shutouts.

While at college, Castanheira also played with Premier Development League side Long Island Rough Riders.

Professional career
On January 11, 2019, Castanheira signed for USL Championship side Atlanta United 2. 

Despite having signed for Atlanta United 2, Castanheira was selected by FC Dallas in the fourth round (88th overall) of the 2019 MLS SuperDraft on January 14, 2019. His MLS rights were traded to expansion side Inter Miami CF on January 8, 2020 in exchange for a fourth-round pick in the 2020 MLS SuperDraft.

On January 27, 2021, Castanheira moved to Fort Lauderdale's parent side Inter Miami in Major League Soccer.

On September 3, 2021, Castanheira joined USL Championship club San Diego Loyal on loan following an injury to San Diego goalkeeper Trey Muse.

Following the 2021 season, Castanheira's contract option was declined by Miami.

On December 17, 2021, Dylan was announced as a member of Atlanta United for the following season. Castanheira's contract option was declined by Atlanta following the 2022 season.

References

External links
 

1995 births
Living people
American soccer players
Association football goalkeepers
Atlanta United FC players
Atlanta United 2 players
Bristol City F.C. players
Inter Miami CF II players
Inter Miami CF players
San Diego Loyal SC players
Columbia Lions men's soccer players
FC Dallas draft picks
Long Island Rough Riders players
Soccer players from New Jersey
USL League Two players
USL Championship players
People from Roxbury, New Jersey
Sportspeople from Morris County, New Jersey
USL League One players